This text is from the Furious Theatre Company website.  Reprinted with permission.

Company history
The critically acclaimed Furious Theatre Company are artists in residence at the Pasadena Playhouse committed to edgy, innovative and original works.

The company debuted in April 2002 after they were generously granted the company the use of a  section of Armory Northwest, a former plastics factory in Pasadena, California.  The company converted the raw warehouse into an alternative performance space.  Risers were constructed, the lighting grid hung, and stage curtains built, all by the ensemble.

In that converted warehouse, they rapidly produced five plays in 12 months. These productions earned 6 NAACP Theatre Award nominations, two LA Weekly Theater Award nominations, and numerous critics’ picks from the Los Angeles media. The company also received the Pasadena Arts Council’s Gold Crown Award and The Debut Award from Backstage West. In September 2003, the City of Pasadena reclaimed the Armory Northwest and Furious needed to move.

After a 13-month search, the Pasadena Playhouse granted Furious a 4-year residency at its Balcony Theatre (recently renamed the Carrie Hamilton Theatre), the Playhouse's 99-seat second stage.

In two seasons at the Playhouse, Furious Theatre Company has produced seven premieres, including the Los Angeles Premieres of Neil Labute’s The Shape of Things, Yussef El Guindi’s Back of the Throat (LA Weekly Award nominee: Best Playwright) and Craig Wright's Grace (Los Angeles Drama Critics Circle Award recipient: Best Production, Best Director, Best Playwright).

Ensemble

Nick Cernoch
Furious acting credits: The Fair Maid of the West Parts I & II, ImMEDIAte Theatre, Tearing the Loom, Scenes from the Big Picture, Mojo

Furious production credits: ImMEDIAte Theatre (co-producer), Tearing the Loom (dramaturg), The God Botherers (stage manager), The Shape of Things (technical director/running crew), Mojo (sound design/assistant director), The Playboy of the Western World (stage manager), Chimps (master carpenter).

With other theatres: Androcles in Androcles and the Lion with Plano Rep. and Motherland, Pavlov\’s Dogs, Freudian Slip Improvisational Comedy(director).

Katie Davies
Furious acting credits: The Fair Maid of the West Parts I & II, ImMEDIAte Theatre, Tearing the Loom, Scenes from the Big Picture

Furious production credits: Tearing the Loom (assistant stage manager), The God Botherers (props design), The Shape of Things (running crew).

With other theatres: Picasso at the Lapin Agile, Dark of the Moon, A Midsummer Night\’s Dream, On The Verge, Letters Home, Cahoot\’s Macbeth, Sex Starved Monkeys, The Stupid Shit We Do For Money, Freudian Slip Improvisational Comedy.

Sara Hennessy
Co-founder

Furious acting credits: The God Botherers, The Shape of Things, Scenes from the Big Picture, Chimps, The Playboy of the Western World, Improv Stunt Show Spectacular.

Furious production credits: The Fair Maid of the West Parts I & II (Dialect Coach), The Shape of Things (costume design), Mojo (costume design), Noise (director), Saturday Night at the Palace (assistant director/costume design).

With other theatres: Another Part of the Forest at the Pasadena Playhouse Hothouse Summer Readings, Hay Fever, Life is a Dream, A Christmas Carol and The Skin of our Teeth at A Noise Within; Ramblers, Genealogy, Looking for Love, Our Town, Othello, Welded, Feiffer\’s People, Seascape.

James C. Leary
Furious acting credits: The Fair Maid of the West Parts I & II, Scenes from the Big Picture, Mojo, Noise and Improv Stunt Show Spectacular.

Furious production credits: The Fair Maid of the West Parts I & II (co-adaptor)

With other theatres: Road to Nirvana, The Babysitter, The Factory West\’s Attack of the Killer B\’s, Welded, Feiffer\’s People, Freudian Slip Improvisational Comedy (co-founder), The Harold at ImprovOlympic.
Film and Television credits: The Comeback, Buffy the Vampire Slayer, Los Beltran, Stunt C\*cks.

Shawn Lee
Co-founder
Furious acting credits: Canned Peaches in Syrup, An Impending Rupture of the Belly, The Fair Maid of the West Parts I & II, Tearing the Loom, The Shape of Things, Scenes from the Big Picture, Chimps, Mojo, Saturday Night at the Palace, Improv Stunt Show Spectacular.

Furious production credits: Grace (scenic design), The God Botherers (scenic design), Scenes from the Big Picture (technical director), Chimps (technical director), Mojo (scenic design), Saturday Night at the Palace (technical director), Noise (scenic design), The Playboy of the Western World (co-scenic design).

With other theatres: Turnaround (technical director), Ramblers, Waiting For Godot, The Diviners, The Zoo Story, Dark of the Moon, Godspell, The Foreigner, Boy\’s Life, Henry IV Part I.

Vonessa Martin
Co-founder
Furious acting credits: Back of the Throat, The Fair Maid of the West Parts I & II, ImMEDIAte Theatre, Tearing the Loom, The Shape of Things, Scenes from the Big Picture, Noise, The Playboy of the Western World, Improv Stunt Show Spectacular.

Furious production credits: Tearing the Loom (co-lighting design), The God Botherers (assistant director), Scenes from the Big Picture (co-sound design), Mojo (director), Chimps (lighting design), The Playboy of the Western World (assistant director, sound design), Saturday Night at the Palace (stage manager).

With other theatres: Dancing at Lughnasa, Ramblers, Front, Pride of Lions, Extremities, Ludlow Fair, Tartuffe, The Diviners.

Doug Newell
Furious acting credits: Impending Rupture of the Belly, Back of the Throat, The Fair Maid of the West Parts I & II, Scenes from the Big Picture.

Furious production credits: ImMEDIAte Theatre (director), The Fair Maid of the West Parts I & II (sound design), Tearing the Loom (sound design), The God Botherers (sound design), The Shape of Things (props design/running crew), Scenes from the Big Picture (props design), Chimps (assistant stage manager), Mojo (running crew).

With other theatres: High Fife Comedy (founder), The Underground, Pavlov’s Dog’s, Freudian Slip Improvisational Comedy.

Eric Pargac
Co-founder

Furious acting credits: The Fair Maid of the West Parts I & II, ImMEDIAte Theatre, Tearing the Loom, Scenes from the Big Picture, Mojo, The Playboy of the Western World, Saturday Night at the Palace, Improv Stunt Show Spectacular.

Furious production credits: The Shape of Things (assistant director/sound design), Scenes from the Big Picture (co-sound design), Chimps (sound design), Mojo (sound engineer), The Playboy of the Western World (sound engineer), Noise (sound design/stage manager).

With other theatres: Turnaround (sound design), Glass Onion house team at ImprovOlympic, Of Mice and Men, Pygmalion, Freudian Slip Improvisational Comedy (co-founder/director), Pirates of Penzance, The Fantasticks, Rimers of Eldritch.

Brad Price
Co-founder

Furious acting credits: The Shape of Things, Scenes from the Big Picture, Mojo, The Playboy of the Western World, Improv Stunt Show Spectacular.

Furious production credits: The Fair Maid of the West Parts I & II (production manager), Tearing the Loom (director), The God Botherers (master carpenter), Chimps (assistant director), Saturday Night at the Palace (master carpenter), Mojo (master carpenter).

With other theatres: Another Part of the Forest at the Pasadena Playhouse (Hothouse Summer Readings), Into the Woods, Lend Me a Tenor, Boys Life, The Foreigner, Brilliant Traces, The Kentucky Cycle and an international tour of Cinderella.

Dámaso Rodriguez
Co-founder
Furious acting credits: Mojo, Noise, Improv Stunt Show Spectacular

Furious production credits: The Fair Maid of the West Parts I & II (director & co-adaptor), The God Botherers (director), The Shape of Things (director), Scenes from the Big Picture (director), Chimps (director), Saturday Night at the Palace (director)*, The Playboy of the Western World (director), Improv Stunt Show Spectacular (director).

With other theatres: Private Lives (assistant director), Star Quality (assistant director) at the Pasadena Playhouse, Another Part of the Forest (director) at the Pasadena Playhouse Hothouse Summer Reading Series, Hay Fever (assistant director/dramaturg), Pericles (assistant director/dramaturg), Life is a Dream, A Christmas Carol and The Skin of our Teeth at A Noise Within; Daedalus (assistant director) at South Coast Repertory; Ramblers, The Harold at Improv Olympic, The Zoo Story, Freudian Slip Improvisational Comedy (co-founder/director).

 NAACP Theatre Award Winner - Best Director

Melissa Teoh
Furious production credits: Canned Peaches in Syrup (scenic design), The Fair Maid of the West Parts I & II (scenic design), Tearing the Loom (scenic design/co-lighting design), The God Botherers (costume design), The Shape of Things (scenic design), Scenes from the Big Picture (scenic design), Chimps (scenic design), Mojo (scenic artist), Playboy of the Western World (co-scenic design/costume design), Noise (scenic artist), Saturday Night at the Palace (scenic design\*).

With other theatres: Pericles, The Wild Duck and The Price at A Noise Within, Circumference of a Squirrel at Taper, Too, Substance of Fire at Theatre Forty, The Misanthrope and I Never Saw Another Butterfly at Edinburgh Fringe Festival; Westside Story, Death of a Salesman, The Barber of Seville, The Woman in Black, The Complete Works of Shakespeare (Abridged).

 NAACP & LA Weekly Award nominee - Best Set Design

Christie Wright
Furious production credits: The Fair Maid of the West Parts I & II (lighting design), The God Botherers (lighting design), The Shape of Things (lighting design), Scenes from the Big Picture (lighting design/stage manager), Chimps (stage manager), Mojo (lighting design), The Playboy of the Western World (lighting design), Noise (lighting design), Saturday Night at the Palace (lighting design*), Improv Stunt Show Spectacular (stage manager).

With other theatres: Ramblers (lighting design & technical direction), Turnaround (lighting design), Impossible Marriage at ACT, R&J at 450 Geary Studio, A Piece of my Heart at ArtRise Studio Theatre.

 NAACP Award nominee - Best Lighting

Other members

Artistic Council
 Sara Hennessy
 Brad Price
 Shawn Lee
 Vonessa Martin
 Eric Pargac
 Dámaso Rodriguez

Staff
 Director of Audience Development - Sara Hennessy
 Director of Communications & Development - Brad Price
 Director of Technical Operations - Shawn Lee
 Managing Director - Vonessa Martin
 Marketing Director - Eric Pargac
 Producing Director - Dámaso Rodriguez
 Associate Marketing Director - Nick Cernoch
 Web Designer - Eric Pargac

Board of directors
 Georgia Bergman
 Sheila Grether-Marion
 Sara Hennessy
 Dianne Magee
 Robert Leventer
 Shawn Lee
 Brad Price
 Vonessa Martin
 Eric Pargac
 Dámaso Rodriguez
 Paul Vandeventer (Chairman)
 Charles W. Pankow
 Walter Cochran-Bond
 Larry Morrison

External links
Furious Theatre Company - Official Site 
 Furious Theatre blog
 Furious Theatre podcast

Furious Theatre Company